Kizhakken Muthoor is a small suburb and ward of Thiruvalla located along the Thiruvalla-Mallapally road.

Government
Kizhakken Muthoor forms a part of Thiruvalla municipality. It is registered as Ward number 4, with a general reservation. Its ward councilor is Thomas Vanchipalam, elected from the KC(M) party.

Transportation
Roads:
Thiruvalla - Mallapally road
Kizhakkenmuthoor - Nattukadavu/Kaviyoor/Manakachirra road
Kizhakenmuthoor - Kannothukadavu road
Kizhakenmuthoor - Chumathra road
Kizhakkenmuthoor - College road

Culture
Religious Places:

St. Paul's Marthoma church
Sharon Fellowship Church KUTTAPUZHA
Padapad Temple
Pallikulagara Temple
Muthoor Bhadrakali Temple
Brethren Church
Believers Church
IPC Bethel Worship Centre
Chumathra Brethren Assembly

Education
Schools & Colleges:
Government Lower Primary School, Muthoor
NSS High School, Muthoor
Thiruvalla Mar Thoma College
Joys Tutorials College
MTLP School
Mar Thoma Residential School
SDA Higher Secondary School
Believers Church School
Jacobite Syrian Christian School
Balavihar
Christ Central School

References 

Villages in Pathanamthitta district